Alexander Carr (1878–1946) was a Russian born stage and screen actor, writer, vaudevillian, burlesque and circus performer.

Biography
He made his first stage appearance on stage at a music hall in St. Paul, Minnesota. He appeared later in theatres in Louisville, Nashville and Buffalo. In Chicago he appeared at the Trocadero theatre. His first New York appearance  was at the Circle Theatre in 1904 at the Circle Theatre in "Wine, Women and Song" imitating David Warfield. He established an on stage partnership with friend Barney Bernard. Beginning in 1913 the two appeared in the long running ethnic Jewish play Potatsh and Perlmutter, one of the most successful plays of the early twentieth century Broadway. Carr played the part of Morris (*or ethnically Mawlruss) Perlmutter. The play was adapted to a silent film in 1923 and a sequel a year later after Bernard died. In addition to the Potash' movies, Carr appeared in silent film sporadically. In sound films his presence is more frequent and finished his last movie in 1940.

His younger brother was Nat Carr.

Carr died in Los Angeles in 1946.

Filmography
Potash and Perlmutter (1923)
In Hollywood with Potash and Perlmutter (1924)
Partners Again (1926)
The Beautiful Cheat (1926)
April Fool (1926)
The End of the World (1929)(*short)
No Greater Love (1932)
Uptown New York (1932)
The Death Kiss (1932)
Hypnotized (1932)
Her Splendid Folly (1933)
The Constant Woman (1933)
Out All Night (1933)
I Hate Women (1934)
Hide-Out (1934)(*uncredited)
Christmas in July (1940)

References

External links

1878 births
1946 deaths
American male film actors
American male silent film actors
Emigrants from the Russian Empire to the United States
Vaudeville performers
20th-century American male actors